Sodium dehydroacetate is a compound with the formula Na(CH3C5HO(O2)(CH3)CO). It is the sodium salt of dehydroacetic acid.

It has E number E266.

Organic sodium salts
Dihydropyrans
Alkoxides